Uplengen is a municipality in the Leer district, in Lower Saxony, Germany.

Parts of the municipality
 Bühren
 Großoldendorf
 Großsander
 Hollen
 Jübberde
 Klein Remels
 Kleinoldendorf
 Kleinsander
 Meinersfehn
 Neudorf
 Neufirrel
 Nordgeorgsfehn
 Oltmannsfehn
 Poghausen
 Remels
 Selverde
 Spols
 Stapel
 Südgeorgsfehn

Gallery

Population
Lutheranism - 84.29%
Reformed churches - 1.48%
Catholic - 2.71%
Different - 11,52%

Politics
The 27 seats of the local council are distributed as follows:
 CDU—20 seats
 SPD—8 seats

References

External links
 Official site 

Towns and villages in East Frisia
Leer (district)